Bertrando Alidosi (died 12 November 1391) was an Italian condottiero and the lord of Imola (as Papal vicar) from 1372 until 1391. He was the son of Roberto Alidosi, and succeeded in his signoria to Azzo Alidosi, to whom he had been associated by will of Pope Urban V. In 1365 he had been also made lord of Castel del Rio, Monte del Fine and Castiglione. The two brothers were jailed in Bologna two times by the papal forces, but they were permitted to return soon to Imola. In 1371 he was forced by a rebellion to flee shortly at Avignon with Pope Gregory XI.

He married Elisa Tarlati, daughter of Maso Tarlati, lord of Pietramala, and sister of cardinal Galeotto Tarlati.

He was succeeded by his son Luigi (Ludovico).

Sources
Page at condottieridiventura.it 

1391 deaths
Bertrando
14th-century condottieri
Year of birth unknown
Lords of Imola